Badol Diner Prothom Kodom Ful is a Bengali drama telefilm written by Humayun Ahmed and directed by Saidul Anam Tutul. It was first aired on Bangladesh Television.

Plot
Shafik (Riaz) is the younger son of a retired government employee. He marries Meera (Richi Solaiman) without his family's concern and afraid to take her home. So, he comes up with a plan and takes her home. But when Shafik is away, Meera tells his father the truth and later they come up with a plan to make fun with Shafik. Meanwhile, Shafik's sister is set to marry a man who is very irritating and trying to escape the fate but, after several series of events, She learns that he really loves her.

Cast
 Riaz as Shafik
Richi Solaiman as Meera
Meher Afroz Shaon as Neetu
 Fazlur Rahman Babu Nitu's fiancé
 Dr. Ejajul Islam as Mijan
 Masud Ali Khan as father
 Challenger as elder brother
Munira Yousuf Memi elder brother's wife
Monira Mithu as Hamider ma/housemaid
 Rahmat Ali Neetu's uncle/Police officer
 Mahbub Ripon
 Mawlana Abdullah
 Lutfor Rahman

References

 

2000s Bangladeshi television series
Bangladeshi drama television series
Bengali-language television programming in Bangladesh
Bangladesh Television original programming